Cécile Manorohanta is a Malagasy politician, currently serving in the government of Madagascar as Deputy Prime Minister for the Interior. Previously she was Minister of Defense from 2007 to 2009.

Manorohanta was appointed as Defense Minister on 27 October 2007 in the government of Prime Minister Charles Rabemananjara. She was the first female defense minister in her country.

On 9 February 2009, Manorohanta announced her resignation, saying that "after all that has happened, I decide as of now to no longer remain part of this government," referring to the shooting on 7 February, during the 2009 Malagasy protests, in which police shot dead at least 50 protesters. Chief of military staff Mamy Ranaivoniarivo was appointed to replace Manorohanta on the same day.

Under Transitional President Andry Rajoelina, Manorohanta was reappointed to the government as Deputy Prime Minister for the Interior on 8 September 2009.

On 18 December 2009, Rajoelina dismissed Prime Minister Eugene Mangalaza, whose appointment had been endorsed by opposition factions as part of a power-sharing agreement, and stated he would appoint Manorohanta in his place. However, on 20 December 2009 Rajoelina instead appointed Albert Camille Vital as Prime Minister.

References

21st-century Malagasy women politicians
21st-century Malagasy politicians
Female defence ministers
Women rulers in Africa
Living people
Women government ministers of Madagascar
Prime Ministers of Madagascar
Defense ministers of Madagascar
Women prime ministers
Year of birth missing (living people)
Female interior ministers